Greatest Hits is a greatest hits album by British rock band The Who that was released on 21 December 2009. The album was also re-released as Greatest Hits & More several weeks after the initial release, which featured a second disc of live songs culled from Greatest Hits Live.

Track listing
All songs written by Pete Townshend except where noted.

Disc one
"I Can't Explain" – 2:05
"My Generation" – 3:17
"The Kids Are Alright" – 3:07
"Substitute" – 3:48
"Happy Jack" – 2:11
"Pictures of Lily" – 2:44
"I Can See for Miles" – 4:08
"Magic Bus" – 3:16
"Pinball Wizard" – 3:02
"Behind Blue Eyes" – 3:43
"Baba O'Riley" – 5:01
"Won't Get Fooled Again" – 8:33
"Love, Reign o'er Me" – 5:54
"Squeeze Box" – 2:42
"Who Are You" (United States single edit) – 3:27
"You Better You Bet" – 5:38
"Eminence Front" – 5:42
"Real Good Looking Boy" (Townshend, Luigi Creatore, Hugo Peretti, George David Weiss) – 5:43
"It's Not Enough" (Townshend, Rachel Fuller) – 4:04

Disc two
"I Can't Explain" (San Francisco Civic Auditorium, San Francisco, 1971) – 2:32
"Substitute" (San Francisco Civic Auditorium, San Francisco, 1971) – 2:10
"Happy Jack" (City Hall, Hull, England, 1970) – 2:12
"I'm a Boy" (City Hall, Hull, England, 1970) – 2:42
"Behind Blue Eyes" (San Francisco Civic Auditorium, San Francisco, 1971) – 3:39
"Pinball Wizard" (Vetch Field, Swansea, Wales, 1976) – 2:48
"I'm Free" (Vetch Field, Swansea, Wales, 1976) – 1:44
"Squeeze Box" (Vetch Field, Swansea, Wales, 1976) – 2:51
"Naked Eye/Let's See Action/My Generation (Medley)" (Charlton Athletic Football Club, Charlton, London, England, 1974) – 14:19
"5:15" (Capital Centre, Largo, Maryland, 1973) – 5:53*
"Won't Get Fooled Again" (Capital Centre, Largo, Maryland, 1973) – 8:38*
"Magic Bus" (University of Leeds Refectory, University of Leeds, Leeds, England, 1970) – 7:33
"My Generation" (Aeolian Hall, London, England, 1965 – BBC recording) – 3:25
"I Can See for Miles" (Universal Amphitheatre, Los Angeles, 1989) – 3:45
"Who Are You" (Universal Amphitheatre, Los Angeles, 1989) – 6:22
"A Man in a Purple Dress" (Nassau Coliseum, Uniondale, New York, 2007) – 4:28
+ 17. bonus track on the Japanese Universal edition only:
"Dancing in the Street" (Spectrum, Philadelphia, 1979) – 3:43

 *These 2 tracks from 1973 are mislabelled, the recording comes from a show in Philadelphia.

Credits (Disc 1)
Roger Daltrey – lead vocals; harmonica (tracks 1–19)
John Entwistle – bass guitar, vocals (tracks 1–17)
Keith Moon – drums (tracks 1–15)
Pete Townshend – guitars, vocals; keyboards (tracks 1–19); lead vocals (track 18)
Kenney Jones – drums (tracks 16–17)
John Bundrick – piano (track 18)
Greg Lake – bass (track 18)
Zak Starkey – drums (track 18)
Simon Townshend – guitar, keyboards (track 18)
Jolyon Dixon – acoustic guitars (track 19)
Peter Huntington – drums (track 19)
Stuart Ross – bass (track 19)

References

The Who compilation albums
The Who live albums
2009 greatest hits albums
2010 live albums